United Left of Asturias (. IU–IX) is the Asturian federation of the Spanish left wing political and social movement United Left. Manuel González Orviz is the current General Coordinator. The Communist Party of Asturias (PCA, Asturian federation of PCE) and Izquierda Abierta (led by the Asturian MP Gaspar Llamazares) are the major members of the coalition.

It has 5 deputies in the Assembly of the Principality of Asturias and one MP (Gaspar Llamazares) in the Congreso de los Diputados, which is integrated in the Parliamentary Group of the Plural Left. Asturies was the autonomy were IU achieved the best results in the general elections of 2011, with the 13.27% of the vote.

Electoral performance

General Junta of the Principality of Asturias

 * In coalition with Bloc for Asturias.
 ** In coalition with Bloc for Asturias and The Greens of Asturias.
 *** In coalition with The Greens.
 **** In coalition with Asturian Left.

References

Notes

External links
Official page

Asturias
Political parties in Asturias